Panhandle is a 1948 Western film directed by Lesley Selander and starring Rod Cameron. This Western marked the writing and producing debuts of Blake Edwards and John C. Champion. Champion later reworked the story as the 1966 Audie Murphy western, The Texican. The team of Edwards, Champion, Selander, and star Rod Cameron reteamed for the 1949 western Stampede. Edwards later produced the police drama City Detective starring Cameron. The series was the first syndicated on television.

Cast
Rod Cameron  as John Sands
Cathy Downs  as   Jean 'Dusty' Stewart
Reed Hadley as	Matt Garson
Anne Gwynne as	June O'Carroll
Blake Edwards as	Floyd Schofield
Dick Crockett 	as	Elliott Crockett
Rory Mallinson as Sheriff Jim
Charles Judels as	Botticelli - the Barber
Alex Gerry 	as	Raven McBride
Francis McDonald as Crump
J. Farrell MacDonald as Doc Cooper 
Henry Hall as	Wells
Stanley Andrews as	Tyler
Jeff York as Jack
James Harrison as Harland
Charles La Torre as Juan
Frank Dae as Regan
Billy Wayne as Gambler

Production
The two producers raised $40,000 of the budget themselves, with Monogram providing $140,000.

References

External links 
 
 
 http://panhandle.pro

1948 films
1940s English-language films
American black-and-white films
Films directed by Lesley Selander
1948 Western (genre) films
American Western (genre) films
Allied Artists films
1940s American films